Dennis Sveum (born November 27, 1986) is a Norwegian ice hockey player for Stavanger Oilers and the Norwegian national team.

He participated at the 2017 IIHF World Championship.

References

External links

1986 births
Living people
Norwegian ice hockey defencemen
Sportspeople from Lillehammer
Stavanger Oilers players
Lillehammer IK players